Vebjørn Alvestad Hoff (born 13 February 1996) is a Norwegian football midfielder who currently plays for Eliteserien side Rosenborg.

He started his career in Spjelkavik, representing their senior team. In 2012, he joined the regional great team Aalesund, but did not make his league debut until July 2014 against Stabæk.

He has represented Norway as a youth international.

Career statistics

Club

References

1996 births
Living people
Sportspeople from Ålesund
Norwegian footballers
Spjelkavik IL players
Aalesunds FK players
Odds BK players
Eliteserien players
Association football midfielders
Norway youth international footballers
Norway under-21 international footballers